Dunc is a masculine given name, usually a short form (hypocorism) of Duncan. It may refer to:

Duncan Dunc Annan (1895–1981), American National Football League player
Dunc “Turbo” Dindas, Turkish graffiti artist
Duncan Dunc Fisher (born 1927), Canadian National Hockey League player
Edgar Dunc Gray (1906–1996), Australian track cyclist
Duncan Dunc McCallum (1940–1983), Canadian World Hockey Association and National Hockey League player and Western Hockey League coach
Duncan Dunc Munro (1901–1958), Canadian National Hockey League player and coach and 1924 Olympic champion team captain
Duncan Dunc Rousseau (born 1945), Canadian ice hockey forward
Duncan Dunc Wilson (born 1948), Canadian National Hockey League goaltender
Dunc, a fictional character in the Culpepper Adventures series by Gary Paulsen

See also
Dunc Gray Velodrome, Sydney, Australia
Dunc McCallum Memorial Trophy, awarded annually to the Coach of the Year in the Western Hockey League
Duncan Ferguson (born 1971), Scottish football coach and former player nicknamed "Big Dunc"
Dunk (disambiguation)

Masculine given names
Hypocorisms